Devumi was an American company which sold fake influence on social media. They were the first company punished by the United States government for selling followers and likes on social media.

Overview
Devumi sold more than 200 million fake followers. Even at its peak the company was tiny with their main office located above a restaurant in Florida. The firm primarily sold Twitter bots sourced from operations like Peakerr, SkillPatron, JAP, Cheap Panel and YTbot at a markup to celebrity and commercial clients. The company also operated on YouTube, SoundCloud, and LinkedIn.

History
In 2018 The New York Times (NYT) published an expose about Devumi which received worldwide attention. The revelations in the story spurred action from regulators. Devumi was forced to shut down soon after the NYT piece was published.

In 2019 owner and CEO German Calas, Jr settled with the Federal Trade Commission (FTC) for $2.5 million. According to the FTC this was the "first-ever complaint challenging the sale of fake indicators of social media influence."

See also
Ghost followers

References

Social media companies